Arctosa leopardus is a species of spiders belonging to the family Lycosidae.

It is native to Europe.

References

leopardus
Spiders described in 1833
Spiders of Europe